Hansje van Halem (born 1978) is a Dutch graphic designer and type designer. Her work is typified by geometric, repetitive, sometimes almost psychedelic patterns.
She works at the intersection of text, illustration, pattern, colour, texture, distortions, interruptions, variations, symmetry, systematic approach and irregularities. Van Halem combines the more open rules of patterns with the tighter ruleset of typography and explores the boundaries of type design. She uses the viewer’s distance to the work to move at the edge of legibility and non-legibility. In her understanding background and type should become one layer. Important to her are the process itself, “playing” around and working with trial and error.  Her commissions rather revolve around the creation of identities, whole covers and patterns than individual fonts.

Hansje van Halem studied graphic and typographic design at the Royal Academy of Art in The Hague from 1998 to 2000. In 2003 she subsequently graduated in Graphic Design from the Rietveld Academy. Since 2003 she has her own studio in Amsterdam. She also gives lectures, workshops, teaches and exhibits since 2003.

Van Halem's designs have been exhibited in many museums, mainly in the Netherlands and the United States. In 2017, a solo exhibition of her work took place at the Bijzondere Collecties van de Universiteit van Amsterdam. Works by Hansje van Halem are included in the collection of the Stedelijk Museum Amsterdam.

Since 2017, she has been the head designer of the Lowlands festival, for which she works with programmers and animators. In 2018, she received a Dutch Design Award for her Lowlands designs.

Typeface
 WIND (2016, a Layered Typeface for Optical Illusions)

Notable Works

 Lowlands (2017 and ongoing, visual identity for music festival)
 Text monument K. Michel Tugelaweg - Design for a 350 meter long text monument remembering the old Jewish area as it was before WWII. Poem written for this occasion by K. Michel (2017)
 SmartGate - fence for Schiphol Airport (2016)
 Walking on Water - floor design for Roman-Catholic church St. Bonifatius on Oostzijde in Zaandam, NL (2015)
 Postage Stamps - TNT Post (2007)

Prizes / Nominations
 2019, Best Dutch Book Design, Theory of Type Design
 2018, Dutch Design Awards, Winner Communication with Lowlands 2018 i.c.w. Marjolein Rinckes, Jurriaan Hos and Just van Rossum
 2011, Dutch Design Awards, Finalist Graphic Design
 2010, Best Photography Books of the Year - Photo España - Phantom City / Kim Bouvy
 2008, Most Beautiful Books 2007 - CO-OPs / Interterritoriale explorations in art and science
 2005, Schönste Bücher aus aller Welt 2004, Leipzig, honorable mention 
 2005, Most Beautiful Books 2004 - Adviezen ter Voorbereiding van het Amsterdams Kunstenplan 2004 - 2008
 2005, Most Beautiful Books 2004 - Mark, Municipal Art Acquisitions 2003 - 2004
 2003, Most Beautiful Annual Reports 2002 - VPRO Annual Report 2002

External links 

 Website Hansje van Halem
 Works of Hansje van Halem in the Stedelijk Museum Amsterdam

References

Living people
Dutch graphic designers
1978 births
People from Enschede